The Glen Campbell Music Show was a syndicated US music television series presented by singer/guitarist Glen Campbell. In 1981 a pilot episode was broadcast. The regular series which followed ran for one season, from September 1982 until 1983.

Cast
 Glen Campbell (host) – vocals, acoustic and electric guitars, bagpipes
 Caledonia (band)
 Kim Darigan – Bass guitar and bass fiddle
 Craig Fall – Vocals, guitar, organ, keyboards
 Steve Hardin – Vocals, organ, harmonica, synthesizer, piano
 Carl Jackson – Vocals, guitar, banjo, fiddle, mandolin
 T.J. Kuenster – Vocals, acoustic and electric pianos
 Steve Turner – Vocals, drums, percussion

Episodes

Production
Executive producer – Pierre Cossette
Producer/director – Bob Henry
Associate Producer – Roger Adams
Associate Director – Paula Burr
Producer Assistant – Gail Purse
Musical director – T.J. Kuenster
Writer – Rod Warren
Costume Supervisor – Bill Belew
Talent Coordinator – Tisha Fein
Production Designer – Rene Lagler
Production Coordinator – Ron Andreassen
Production Assistant – Syngehilde Schweikart
Production Associates – Keith Henry, Joel Valentincic
Unit Manager – Tim Stevens
Technical Director – Karl Messerschmidt
Lighting – Olin Younger
Audio – Joe Ralston
Video Tape Editors – Andy Zall, Kevin Fernan
Stage Managers – Steve Burgess, Vince Poxon
Production Executive – Dee Brantlinger
A production of Gaylord Entertainment Television and The Glen Campbell Company

The Glen Campbell Video Collection
Two episodes of The Glen Campbell Music Show were released on video in 1990.

See also
The Glen Campbell Goodtime Hour

References

1980s American television series